Patrick Anderson (born 22 August 1979) is a Canadian wheelchair basketball player.

Personal life
Anderson was born in Edmonton, Alberta, Canada, and he grew up in Fergus, Ontario. At the age of nine he was hit by a drunk driver, and as a result lost both his legs below the knee. Because of this, he is classified as a 4.5-point player for competition.

Basketball
Anderson is widely considered to be one of the best wheelchair basketball players in the world.  He began playing the sport in 1990 and was first chosen for the Canadian national team in 1997.

He led the Canadian Junior Men's National Team to victories in the World Championships in 1997 and 2001, and was named MVP at both competitions. At senior level he was a member of the team that won a bronze medal at the 1998 World Championships and was chosen as a member of the all-star team for the event.

In 2000 he represented Canada at the Paralympics for the first time at the Sydney Games. The Canadian team won the gold medal in the men's tournament. He won his second Paralympic gold medal at the 2004 Summer Paralympics in Athens, Greece, where the Canadian team defeated Australia in the final.

At the 2008 Summer Paralympics in Beijing, China, Anderson was a member of the Canadian team who won the silver medal after losing to the team from Australia in the final. After the 2008 Games, he retired from basketball and moved to New York to attend university in order to fulfill his dream of becoming a professional musician.

Having come out of retirement in 2011, Anderson was selected to compete for Canada at the 2012 Summer Paralympics in London, United Kingdom. Canada advanced through the group stages of the tournament, beat Spain in the quarterfinals and defeated hosts Great Britain in the semifinals to reach the gold medal match against Australia. In the final Anderson scored 34 points, had 10 rebounds and 8 assists as Canada won the gold medal with a 64–58 victory.

References

External links
 
 

1979 births
Living people
Canadian men's wheelchair basketball players
Paralympic wheelchair basketball players of Canada
Paralympic gold medalists for Canada
Paralympic silver medalists for Canada
Paralympic medalists in wheelchair basketball
Wheelchair basketball players at the 2000 Summer Paralympics
Wheelchair basketball players at the 2004 Summer Paralympics
Wheelchair basketball players at the 2008 Summer Paralympics
Wheelchair basketball players at the 2012 Summer Paralympics
Wheelchair basketball players at the 2020 Summer Paralympics
Medalists at the 2000 Summer Paralympics
Medalists at the 2004 Summer Paralympics
Medalists at the 2008 Summer Paralympics
Medalists at the 2012 Summer Paralympics
Illinois Fighting Illini Paralympic athletes
Galatasaray S.K. (wheelchair basketball) players